I Love Wolffy 2 is a 2013 Chinese animated comedy film directed by Kai Ye based on the animated television series Pleasant Goat and Big Big Wolf. It was preceded by the 2012 film I Love Wolffy. The film was released on August 1, 2013.

Cast
Yingjun Zhao
Zixuan Wang
Jingsen Cai
Taneem Mannan

Reception
The film earned  at the Chinese box office.

References

External links

Pleasant Goat and Big Big Wolf
Chinese animated films
2013 animated films
2013 films
Animated comedy films
2013 comedy films